This is a list of American Civil War monuments and memorials associated with the Union. Monuments and memorials are listed below alphabetically by state. States not listed have no known qualifying items for the list.

Washington, D.C.

 Civil War Monuments in Washington, D.C., includes monuments to 16 Union generals, admirals and others
 Lincoln Statue by sculptor Lot Flannery, 1868
 Abraham Lincoln by Vinnie Ream, located in the Capitol Rotunda, 1871
 General John A. Rawlins, Joseph A. Bailly, sculptor, 1874
 Brevet Lt. General Winfield Scott, Henry Kirke Brown, sculptor, 1874
 Emancipation Memorial, Thomas Ball, sculptor, 1876
 Major General James B. McPherson, Louis Rebisso, sculptor 1876
 Peace Monument, 1877
 Major General George Henry Thomas, 1879
 Admiral David G. Farragut, 1881
 Pension Building frieze, Caspar Buberl sculptor, 1887
 The Warrior, James A. Garfield Monument, J.Q.A. Ward, sculptor,  1887
 General Winfield Scott Hancock, 1896

 Major General John A. Logan, 1901
 General William Tecumseh Sherman Monument, 1903
 Major General George B. McClellan, 1907
 Equestrian statue of Philip Sheridan, 1908
 Stephenson Grand Army of the Republic Memorial, 1909
 Dupont Circle Fountain, 1921
 Lincoln Memorial, 1922
 Lincoln seated statue sculpted by Daniel Chester French and carved by the Piccirilli Brothers
 "The Gettysburg Address" carved inscription
 Second Inaugural Address carved inscription
 Ulysses S. Grant Memorial, 1924
 Nuns of the Battlefield, 1924
 George Gordon Meade Memorial, Charles Grafly, sculptor, 1927
 African American Civil War Memorial, 1997
 U Street (WMATA station), which contains "African-American Civil War Memorial/Cardozo" in its subtitle.

U.S. Currency

 U.S. one-cent coin
 Lincoln's Bust, depicted on Front since 1909
 Lincoln Memorial, depicted on Back from 1959 – 2008
 Lincoln Bicentennial, depicted on Back in 2009
 U.S. five-dollar bill
 Lincoln's Portrait, depicted on Front since 1914
 Lincoln Memorial, depicted on Back since 1929
 U.S. fifty-dollar bill
 Grant's Portrait, depicted on Front since 1913
 U.S. Postage Stamps
 Abraham Lincoln Postage, 2nd in number for Presidents of US Stamps issues including 1866, 1869, 1890, 1903, 1938, 1954, 1965, 1995
 US 5-cents commemorative stamp, 1963

US military

Bases
 Fort Greely, Alaska (1942) named in honor of Major General Adolphus Greely.
 Fort Logan / Fort Logan National Cemetery, Colorado (1889) named in honor of General John A. Logan. Closed in 1960.
 Fort Sheridan, Illinois (1888), named for Gen. Philip Sheridan. Closed in 1993.

Gallery

Arizona 
 Picacho Peak State Park, Stone Monument Shaft. Erected by the Arizona Pioneers Historical Society and Southern Pacific Railroad Company on April 15, 1928. It commemorates the 3 Union soldiers who lost their life during the Battle of Picacho Pass and list their names. The dedication was a grand ceremony with many people attending and multiple organizations including the Woman's Relief Corps, Daughters of the American Revolution, and the Grand Army of the Republic. In the 21st century a plaque dedicated to the Confederate veterans which was on a wall by the stone monument was removed and it was cemented on the bottom of the Union plaque. The plaque was later stolen.
 Southern Arizona Veterans Memorial Cemetery. A small flagstone with a Grand Army of the Republic medal on the front of it honors the dead Union veterans within the cemetery. The stone was erected in the 2000s by the Sons of Union Veterans of the Civil War Camp Negley Post of Tucson and the Burnside Post of Tombstone.
 Southern Arizona Veterans Memorial Cemetery. A small flagstone that commemorates the 18 California Volunteers Union veterans and one colored troop buried in the cemetery. Erected by the Sons of Union Veterans of the Civil War, Department of California.
 Prescott, Arizona. Plaque dedicated to the memory of the more than 50 Union Veterans buried with Citizens' Cemetery and their pioneer spirit that led to Arizona's statehood in 1912. Dedicated by the Sons of Union Veterans of the Civil War, Department of the Southwest on August 17, 2022.
 Tombstone, Arizona. Oldest Union monument in the State of Arizona erected "In memory of the comrades of Burnside Post G.A.R." dedicated on May 30, 1887 and is placed at the Old Tombstone Cemetery.

Arkansas 
Gentry
Gentry Grand Army of the Republic Memorial, installed in 1918, listed on the National Register of Historic Places in 2016
 Grant County, Arkansas is named after Ulysses S Grant, 1869
 Judsonia, Arkansas: Grand Army of the Republic Memorial, obelisk surrounded by 16 union soldier graves, 1894
 Leola, Arkansas: Officers Killed / Union Wounded Memorial (2015)
 Little Rock,
 Minnesota Monument, in the Little Rock National Cemetery in 1916.
 Pea Ridge, Arkansas: Reunited Soldiery Monument (1889), one of the first to honor both Union and Confederate soldiers to be placed on a battlefield.
 Prairie Grove Battlefield State Park:
 Generals James G. Blunt and Francis J. Herron Memorial
 Lieutenant Colonel John C. Black Marker
 Sheridan is named after Union general Phillip Sheridan during the Reconstruction Era.
 Siloam Springs, Arkansas: Grand Army of the Republic Memorial (Siloam Springs, Arkansas), 1928

California 

 Monument to volunteers from Los Gatos

Schools

 Lincoln Elementary School in Newark
 Lincoln Elementary School in Oakland

Colorado 

 Garfield County was named after James A. Garfield, 1883
 "Soldier's Monument", Colorado State Capitol grounds, Jack (or John) Howland, sculptor, dedicated July 24, 1909

Connecticut

 Soldiers' Monument in Bristol, Connecticut, ca. 1865
 Soldiers and Sailors Memorial Arch, Hartford, 1886
 Joseph Roswell Hawley rondel, Connecticut State Capitol, Herbert Adams  1878

Schools

 Lincoln College of Technology in East Windsor
 Lincoln College of New England in Southington, 2010 (formerly known as Briarwood College)

Delaware 
 General Alfred Thomas Archimedes Torbert, Milford, erected in 2008
 Rear Admiral Samuel Francis Du Pont, originally erected in Dupont Circle, Washington D.C. in 1884, moved to Rockford Park, Wilmington in 1920
 Soldiers and Sailors Monument (Delaware), Wilmington, erected in 1871

Florida
These are arranged by city:

 2nd Regiment Infantry, U.S. Colored Troops Monument, Centennial Park, Fort Myers, dedicated in 2000
 Union Soldier's Memorial, Evergreen Cemetery, Jacksonville, erected in 1891
 Forgotten Soldier Memorial, in honor of African-American soldiers, Bayview Park, Key West, unveiled February 16, 2016
 Obelisk at Clinton Square, Bayview Park, Key West, circa 1866
 Monument Park, Lynn Haven, dedicated in 1920
 G.A.R. Memorial, Woodlawn Cemetery, Miami, dedicated on April 12, 1939
 G.A.R. Monument, Greenwood Cemetery, Orlando, 1910
 G.A.R. Monument, Veterans Park, St. Cloud, erected in 2000
 Unknown Soldiers Monument, Mount Peace Cemetery, St. Cloud, 1915
 Union Monument, Greenwood Cemetery, St. Petersburg, erected in 1900
 Daughter of Union Veterans Monument, Oaklawn Cemetery, Tampa
 In Memory of Our Union Veterans, Woodlawn Cemetery, Tampa

Schools

 Old Lincoln High School (also known as Lincoln Academy) in Tallahassee, 1869. School closed in 1967–68.
 Lincoln High School (Tallahassee, Florida)
 Lincoln High School (Gainesville, Florida)

Illinois
 Soldiers' Monument (Freeport, Illinois), 1871
 Civil War Memorial (Sycamore, Illinois), 1896
 General John A. Logan Monument, Augustus Saint-Gaudens and A. Phimister Proctor, sculptors, Grant Park, Chicago, 1897
 The Soldiers' Monument, Oregon, Lorado Taft, sculptor 1916
 Statue of Richard J. Oglesby, Chicago, Leonard Crunelle, 1919
 General Philip Henry Sheridan, Gutzon Borglum, sculptor, Chicago, 1923
 Grand Army of the Republic Memorial Woods in River Forest, part of the Forest Preserve District of Cook County
 Ulysses S. Grant Monument, Lincoln Park, Chicago, 1891

Schools

 Lincoln College (Illinois) private in Lincoln, 1865. Was the first establishment named for Abraham Lincoln and the only one during his lifetime.
 Lincoln College of Technology in Melrose Park
 Carterville
 John A. Logan College, 1967
 Springfield,
 Lincoln Land Community College, 1967
 The Lincoln Academy of Illinois, 1964

Georgia 
 Illinois Monument, 1914
 Wilder Brigade Monument, 1899

Indiana

 Soldiers and Sailors Monument (Delphi, Indiana), 1888
 Soldiers' and Sailors' Monument (Indianapolis), 1888
 Corydon: Corydon Battle Site is a memorial to both sides that fought in the Civil War Battle of Corydon.
 Colonel Richard Owen (bust), presented by Confederate organizations in honor of Union prison war camp director
 Lincoln Bank Tower, 3 panels, Pioneer Backwoodsman, Preservation of the Union and Emancipation Proclamation Fort Wayne, Indiana, 1930

Iowa
 Abraham Lincoln Statue and Park, Clermont, dedicated June 19, 1903, erected in memory of Civil War soldiers and sailors
 Soldier's Monument (Davenport, Iowa), 1881
 Sac City Monument Square Historic District, Sac City
 General Sherman Hall; honors service of William T. Sherman 1892
 Memorial Statue; 19 foot tall granite and bronze monument of Sherman unveiled Nov. 23 1894
 4 Civil War Cannon; "whether it was idle curiosity or absence of thought that caused Phil Schaller to fire one of the cannon to awaken the town on July 4, 1895, one will never know. The force of the cannon fire broke all the windows on the south side of the court house and many windows in the Main Street business district. (Sac City, Iowa, p. 19)" 
 Soldiers and Sailors Monument, Des Moines, Carl Rohl-Smith, sculptor, 1896
 Clayton County Soldiers' and Sailors' Monument, Elkader, W. H. Mullins Company

Schools

 Lincoln Elementary School in Manchester, 1916

Kansas
According to Kansas Civil War Monuments and Memorials, there are 105 counties in Kansas most have a monument to Union soldiers of the Civil War. Many were funded by GAR posts or Sons of Union Civil War Veterans, today the Sons of Union Veterans of the Civil War.

Monuments and memorials in Kansas include:
 Kinsley Civil War Monument, in Hillside Cemetery, Kinsley, Kansas, listed on the National Register of Historic Places in Edwards County
 Sherman County, Kansas, named after General William Tecumseh Sherman, 1873
 Grant County, Kansas is a county in Kansas named after Ulysses S. Grant, commanding general of Union Army during the Civil War, 1888
 Ulysses, Kansas is a city named after Ulysses S. Grant, 1885
 McPherson, Kansas and McPherson County are named after Union General James McPherson. There is also a monument to him and another monument to Union Civil War soldiers fighting for him. The monument was erected in 1917.
 Baxter Springs Civil War Monument erected in 1886 after Grand Army of the Republic (GAR) post collected more than 7,000 signatures from former soldiers. The monument is located in the Soldier's Lot of the Baxter Springs Cemetery, and is dedicated to the 132 soldiers who died in the Battle of Baxter Springs October 8, 1863.
Grand Army of the Republic (GAR) Memorial Arch, erected 1898 in Junction City, Kansas, NRHP-listed

Kentucky
 Battle of Tebb's Bend Monument, near Campbellsville.  It includes a historical marker from state of Michigan, commemorating the Union soldiers, mostly immigrants from the Netherlands, who were given battle orders in Dutch.
 GAR Monument, Covington, 1929.
 Veteran's Monument, Covington.  One of only two monuments in Kentucky to both Union and Confederate war dead, 1933.
 Colored Soldiers Monument, Frankfort's Green Hill Cemetery. One of the relatively few monuments to black soldiers that participated in the American Civil War, 1924.
 Captain Andrew Offutt Monument,  Lebanon, 1921.
 Confederate-Union Veterans' Monument, Morgantown at the Butler County Courthouse, 1907.
 32nd Indiana Monument, near Munfordville.  The oldest surviving memorial to the Civil War, 1862.
 Union Monument, Perryville, 1928.
 Union Monument, Vanceburg, 1884.

Louisiana 
 Grant Parish, Louisiana is named after Ulysses S Grant, 1869.

Maine
 Memorial Hall (Oakland, Maine), 1870
 Monument Square (Portland, Maine), which includes the Portland Soldiers and Sailors Monument by sculptor Franklin Simmons, 1891.

Maryland
 United States Colored Troops Memorial Statue (Lexington Park, Maryland), 2012
 Union Soldiers and Sailors Monument in Baltimore, 1909
 The American Volunteer (statue), Antietam National Cemetery, Sharpsburg
 Monuments at Antietam National Battlefield

Massachusetts
 Memorial Hall (Dedham, Massachusetts)
 Civil War Memorial, Framingham, Martin Milmore, sculptor, 1872
 Civil War Monument (Great Barrington, Massachusetts), 1876
 Civil War Memorial (Webster, Massachusetts), 1907
 Equestrian statue of Charles Devens, 1906
 Memorial Hall (Harvard University), Cambridge, 1878
 Robert Gould Shaw Memorial (Boston), 1884
Soldiers' and Sailors' Monument (Arlington) 1887
 Soldiers and Sailors Monument (Boston), 1887
 Soldiers' Monument (Worcester, Massachusetts), 1874
 The Rockery, Easton, 1882
 Charlestown Civil War Memorial
 North Adams, Massachusetts

Michigan
 Michigan Soldiers' and Sailors' Monument, Randolph Rogers, sculptor; (Detroit), 1867
 Civil War Memorial (Adrian, Michigan), 1870
 Kent County Civil War Monument, Grand Rapids, American (White) Bronze Company 1885
 Defense of the Flag, Withington Park, Lorado Taft, Jackson, Michigan, 1904.
 Abraham Lincoln Monument (Ypsilanti, Michigan), 1938

 Soldiers’ and Sailors’ Monument, 1887, Hastings, Michigan in Tyden Park.

Minnesota
 Grant County, Minnesota is named after Ulysses S Grant

 A monument to all Union soldiers and sailors is located in Bridge Square in Northfield, Minnesota.

Mississippi
 Monument to United States Colored Troops (1st and 3rd Mississippi Infantry, African Descent) at Vicksburg National Military Park. The inscription reads: "Commemorating the Service of the 1st and 3d Mississippi Infantry, African Descent and All Mississippians of African Descent Who Participated in the Vicksburg Campaign."
 Monument to the 18th Wisconsin Volunteer Infantry Regiment at Vicksburg National Military Park.
 Monument to admiral David Farragut at Vicksburg National Military Park. Henry Hudson Kitson, sculptor
 The Illinois Memorial at Vicksburg National Military Park. Commemorating the 36,325 Illinois soldiers who participated in the Vicksburg Campaign and has 47 steps, one for every day Vicksburg was besieged.
 Kentucky memorial composed of bronze statues of Abraham Lincoln and Jefferson Davis, both native Kentuckians, Vicksburg National Military Park.
 The Michigan Memorial at Vicksburg National Military Park.

Monuments and Memorials at Vicksburg National Military Park

Missouri 

 Attorney General Edward Bates statue in Forest Park, St. Louis, dedicated 1876
 General Francis Preston Blair Jr. statue in Forest Park, St. Louis, dedicated 1885
 General Franz Sigel statue in Forest Park, St. Louis, dedicated 1906
 General Ulysses S. Grant statue on the grounds of City Hall, St. Louis, dedicated 1888
 Grant City, Missouri is named after General Ulysses S. Grant
 Lincoln, Missouri is named after Abraham Lincoln
 Lyon Park in St. Louis is named after Brigadier-General Nathaniel Lyon
 President Abraham Lincoln statue on the grounds of City Hall, Kansas City, by sculptor Lorenzo Ghiglieri, dedicated 1986

Schools

 Lincoln College Preparatory Academy in Kansas City
 Lincoln University in Jefferson City

Montana 

 Garfield County was named after James A. Garfield

Nebraska 
 Grant County, Nebraska is named after Ulysses S Grant
 Garfield County was named after James A. Garfield
 Emancipation Proclamation panel, Nebraska State Capitol, Lincoln, Nebraska, Lee Lawrie, sculptor,  (1932)
 Lincoln, Nebraska is named after Abraham Lincoln
 Civil War Memorial statue in Blair, Nebraska
 U.S. Route 6, running through the entirety of Nebraska, is named Grand Army of the Republic Highway

New Hampshire

 a casting of the Robert Gould Shaw Memorial is located at the Saint-Gaudens National Historic Site in Cornish, New Hampshire, Augustus Saint-Gaudens sculptor, originally cast in 1897.

New Jersey

Schools

 Lincoln Tech in Newark, 1946

New Mexico 
 Grant County, New Mexico is named after Ulysses S Grant
 Santa Fe, New Mexico Soldiers' Memorial dedicated to the Federal Troops that fought in the Battle of Val Verde. Monument was destroyed on Oct 20, 2020 and never restored.

New York
 Elmira Prison, where Confederate POWs were held; also site of Camp Rathbun, where soldiers trained.
 Seventh Regiment Memorial, New York City, John Quincy Adams Ward, sculptor 1869/1874
 Soldiers and Sailors Monument (Buffalo), Caspar Buberl, sculptor, 1882
 Lewis County Soldiers' and Sailors' Monument, Lowville in Lewis County, 1883.
 Soldiers and Sailors Monument (Troy, New York), 1890
 Soldiers' and Sailors' Arch (Brooklyn), 1892
 Sherman Monument, Grand Army Plaza in Manhattan, New York, Augustus Saint-Gaudens, 1902
 Soldiers' and Sailors' Monument (Manhattan), 1902
 Soldiers and Sailors Monument (Syracuse), 1910
 Cattaraugus County Civil War Memorial and Historical Building, Little Valley, NY (1914)

North Carolina

Schools

 Lincoln Academy in Kings Mountain, 1886
Salisbury national cemetery, Union monument, 1876
Salisbury national cemetery, Maine monument, 1908
Salisbury national cemetery, Pennsylvania monument, 1910
New Bern national cemetery, Connecticut monument, 1894
New Bern national cemetery, New Jersey monument, 1905
New Bern national cemetery, Massachusetts monument, 1908
New Bern national cemetery, Rhode Island monument, 1910
Hertford, US colored troops monument, 1910
Goldsborough Bridge battle, (jointly with CSA troops)
Averasboro, 20th Corps monument, 2001
Bentonville battlefield, Sherman's 4 corps monument, 2013
Bentonville battlefield, 123rd New York monument, 2012
Bentonville battlefield, horse and mule monument (jointly with CSA), 2011
Bennett place, Durham, NC, Unity monument (jointly with CSA), 1923

North Dakota 
 Grant County, North Dakota is named after Ulysses S Grant

Ohio
 Jewish Civil War Memorial (Cincinnati, Ohio), 1868
 Circleville Memorial Hall, in Circleville, c.1871
 Civil War Soldiers Monument (Dayton), 1884
 Soldiers' and Sailors' Monument (Cleveland), 1894
  Phillip Sheridan equestrian statue (Somerset), Carl Heber sculptor, 1905
 The figure at the top of the monument, for which Private Fair served as the model, was replaced by a bronze version of the same piece in 1993, the Fair statue now serving as another monument.
 Dayton Memorial Hall, which commemorates the Civil War as well as other wars
 These Are My Jewels monument (Columbus)

Oklahoma 
 Ardmore, Oklahoma: Union Monument in front of Veterans Home (old Confederate Home)
 Enid, Oklahoma: Union Monument in Enid Cemetery to the unknown dead by LGAR (1917)
 Fort Blunt: abandoned old Fort Gibson, renamed for Maj. Gen. James G. Blunt during Civil War 1862.
 Garfield County was named after James A. Garfield
 Grant County, Oklahoma is named after Ulysses S Grant
 Miami, Oklahoma: GAR Cemetery Monument, obelisk honors dead soldiers by WRC and GAR.
 Oklahoma City: Union Monument in Fairlawn Cemetery by GAR (1918), later broadened with new plaque to honor all US soldiers.
 Rentiesville, Oklahoma: Monument to Union Soldiers in Honey Springs Battlefield (1986)

Oregon 
 Grant County, Oregon is named after Ulysses S. Grant.
 Grants Pass, Oregon is named after Ulysses S. Grant.
 Daughters of Union Veterans Civil War Memorial, City View Cemetery, Salem
 Sherman County, Oregon is named after William T. Sherman.
 Crook County, Oregon is named after George Crook.

Schools

 Lincoln Elementary School in Eugene 1953 (converted from prior Woodrow Wilson Junior High School). School closed in 1987 and repurposed as Lincoln School Condominiums.

Pennsylvania
 List of monuments of the Gettysburg Battlefield, at Gettysburg National Military Park, has numerous Union monuments and memorials
 44th New York Monument, 1893, first Gettysburg monument with an observation deck
 72nd Pennsylvania Infantry Monument, 1891
 Army of the Potomac Marker (1908)
 Brig. Gen. Francis Barlow Statue (1922)
 Maj. Gen. John Buford Statue (1895)
 John L. Burns Statue (1903)
 Father William Corby Statue (1910)
 Brig. Gen. Samuel W. Crawford Statue (1988)
 Culp Brothers' Memorial (2013) Near entrance Gettysburg Heritage Center, Honors Confederate Private Wesley Culp and brother Union Army, Lieutenant William Culp ("brother against brother").
 Delaware State Monument (2000)
 Maj. Gen. Thomas Devin Relief, 6th New York Cavalry Monument (1889)
 Maj. Gen. Abner Doubleday Statue (1917)
 Maj. Gen. Abner Doubledays Headquarters Marker, 1st Corps Headquarters Marker (1913)
 Colonel Augustus van Horne Ellis Statue, 124th New York Infantry Monument (1884)
 Captain Henry V. Fuller Marker, 64th New York Infantry (1894)
 Statue of Gen. John Geary, Culp's Hill sculpted by J. Otto Schweizer (c. 1914)
 Statue of General Alexander Hays, Ziegler's Grove sculpted by J. Otto Schweizer (c. 1914)
 Statue of General Andrew A. Humphreys, Emmitsburg Road sculpted by J. Otto Schweizer 1919
 Indiana State Monument (1971)
 Lincoln Address Memorial, Gettysburn National Cemetery designed by Louis Henrick 1912
 Bust of bust of Abraham Lincoln, by Henry Kirke Bush-Brown 1912
 New York State Monument (1893)
 New York Auxiliary State Monument (1925)
 Pennsylvania State Memorial, Gettysburg, 1914 also includes several portrait statues,
 Abraham Lincoln (1911–13) by J. Otto Schweizer, west side
 Governor Andrew Curtin (1911–13) by William Clark Noble, west side
 General George Meade (1911–13) by Lee Lawrie, north side
 General John F. Reynolds (1911–13) by Lee Lawrie, north side
 General Winfield Scott Hancock (1911–13) by Cyrus Edwin Dallin, east side
 General David McMurtrie Gregg (1911–13) by J. Otto Schweizer, east side
 General Alfred Pleasonton (1911–13) by J. Otto Schweizer, south side
 General David B. Birney (1911–13) by Lee Lawrie, south side
 Soldiers' National Monument
 United States Regulars Monument (1909)
 United States Signal Corps Marker (1919)
 Vermont State Monument, "Stannard's Vermont Brigade Monument" (1889)
 Statue of Gen Wells, sculpted by J. Otto Schweizer 1914
 Soldiers and Sailors Monument (Lancaster, Pennsylvania), 1874
 Soldier's Monument, York, Martin Milmore, sculptor, 1874
 Dauphin County Veteran's Memorial Obelisk, Harrisburg, by 1876?
 Soldiers' and Sailors' Monument – Allentown, Edward Gallagher Jr., Henry F. Plaschott, Bartholomew Donovan, sculptors, 1899
 Smith Memorial Arch, Philadelphia, 1898–1912
 "First Defenders", Allentown, George Brewster, sculptor, 1917
 Soldiers and Sailors Monument, Easton (1900)
 Soldiers and Sailors Memorial Bridge, Lee Lawrie, sculptor Harrisburg, Pennsylvania  South pylon is inscribed with the date "1861," (1930)

Schools
 Lincoln Elementary School in Pittsburgh, 1931

Rhode Island
 Equestrian statue of Ambrose Burnside in Burnside Park, Providence, Rhode Island, 1887
 Soldiers and Sailors Monument (Providence), Rhode Island, 1871
 Woonsocket Civil War Monument, Woonsocket, Rhode Island, 1868
 The Union Soldier, Roger Williams Park, Providence, Rhode Island (1898). This statue is a replica of an original located at Gettysburg. Cast by the Gorham Manufacturing Company.

South Dakota 
 Grant County, South Dakota is named after Ulysses S Grant

Tennessee 
 Fort Negley, Nashville. The Fort was built by Union forces after the capture of Nashville.

Texas
 Treue der Union Monument, in Comfort

Utah 
 Salt Lake City, Utah Captain Lot Smith Company Memorial
 Garfield County was named after James A. Garfield
 Salt Lake City, Utah Monument dedicated to the GAR dead in the GAR and USAWV Veteran Section of Mt. Olivet Cemetery. Re-dedicated in 2003 by the Sons of Union Veterans. 
 Salt Lake City, Utah Bench dedicated to Civil War Veterans which sits in the GAR Section of Mt. Olivet Cemetery and was erected by the W. O. Howard Woman's Relief Corps in 1939.

Vermont 
 Statue of Gen Wells, in Battery Park (Burlington, Vermont) sculpted by J. Otto Schweizer 1914

Virginia 
 Monuments within Arlington National Cemetery, Arlington
 Civil War Unknowns Monument, 1865
 Tanner Amphitheater, built to support early Decoration Day events
 Charlottesville: Emancipation Park in Charlottesville named in honour of Emancipation Proclamation, 2017
 Norfolk: West Point Cemetery, Norfolk African-American Civil War Memorial
 Petersburg:
 48th Pennsylvania Monument, in memory Colonel George W. Gowen and 48th Regiment 1907
 Petersburg National Battlefield: Monument to the United States Colored Troops who fought during the Siege of Petersburg.
 Portsmouth: Civil War Monument at Lincoln Cemetery (Portsmouth, Virginia)
 Franklin: General Thomas Highway (Route 671).

Washington 
 Grant County, Washington is named after Ulysses S Grant
 Garfield County was named after James A. Garfield
 Grand Army of the Republic Cemetery (Seattle) established in 1895.
 Port Angeles, Washington:  Memorial garden in downtown with a plaque honoring the Grand Army of the Republic.
 Bellingham, Washington: Cornwall Park, the memorial dedicated to the Grand Army of the Republic, Department of Washington and Alaska.

West Virginia 
 Grant County, West Virginia is named after Ulysses S Grant
 Grantsville, Calhoun County, West Virginia is named after Ulysses S Grant
 Wheeling Soldier and Sailors Monument, dedicated in 1883. In 2018 it was moved next to West Virginia Independence Hall.  It was rededicated on 27 May 2018 (Memorial Day Observed).
 Hancock County, West Virginia Union Monument, dedicated 1886 in front of the Hancock County Courthouse, New Cumberland.
 Jackson County, West Virginia GAR Monument, in front of Jackson County Courthouse, Ripley.
 The Mountaineer Monument (1912), placed as a response to the 1910 Stonewall Jackson at the Capitol in downtown Charleston which burned in 1921.  Moved to the new Capitol Complex, Charleston, Kanawha County
 Soldiers & Sailors Monument (1930), Capitol Complex, Charleston, Kanawha County

Former
 Huntington Union monument dedicated by Bailey Post of the G.A.R. Formerly located at the corner of Fifth Ave. and Ninth St., it was scheduled to be moved to Ritter Park in 1915, but was subsequently lost.

Wisconsin
The Victorious Charge, by John S. Conway, located on the Court of Honor on West Wisconsin Avenue in downtown Milwaukee, Wisconsin, United States. The 1898 bronze sculpture is 9'10" high and sits on a 20' square granite pedestal.
 Winged Victory, Simmons Library Park, Kenosha Wisconsin (1900)

Scotland
 American Civil War Memorial, in Old Calton Burial Ground, in Edinburgh, Scotland

See also
 Memorials to Abraham Lincoln
 List of memorials to the Grand Army of the Republic
 Grand Army of the Republic Hall (disambiguation), including numerous memorials in the form of buildings
List of Confederate monuments and memorials
List of Mexican-American War monuments and memorials
List of Korean War memorials
List of Vietnam War monuments and memorials
List of World War I monuments and memorials
List of World War II monuments and memorials

External links
Maine Civil War Monuments
Massachusetts Civil War Monument Project

References

Lists of American Civil War monuments and memorials
American Civil War-related lists
Union (American Civil War) monuments and memorials